The name Sebastien has been used for two tropical cyclones in the Atlantic Ocean. 

 Tropical Storm Sebastien (1995), made landfall in Anguilla as a tropical depression.
 Tropical Storm Sebastien (2019), late-season tropical storm that stayed out at sea.

Atlantic hurricane set index articles